Maria Rosaria Omaggio (born 11 January 1954) is an Italian actress and writer.

Born in Rome, Maria Rosaria Omaggio debuted in 1973 in the Italian show Canzonissima. In 1976 she made her film debut with two "poliziotteschi" alongside Tomas Milian, The Tough Ones and The Cop in Blue Jeans, and later starred in numerous films and TV series. She is also active on stage, and in 2011 celebrated her 25th year in theater with the recital Omaggio a voi. One of her latest films is Walesa. Man of Hope (2013), directed by Andrzej Wajda, where she stars as Oriana Fallaci.

She is a goodwill ambassador for UNICEF.

Selected filmography
The Tough Ones (1976)
The Cop in Blue Jeans (1976)
La segretaria privata di mio padre (1976)
La lozana andaluza (1976)
La malavita attacca... la polizia risponde! (1977)
El virgo de Visanteta (1979)
Visanteta, estáte quieta (1979)
Los locos vecinos del 2º (1980)
Nightmare City (1980)
Culo e camicia (1981)
The Adventures of Hercules (1985)
It Was a Dark and Stormy Night (1985)
Rimini Rimini - Un anno dopo (1988)
The Museum of Wonders (2010)
Walesa. Man of Hope (2013)

References

External links 
 

1957 births
Living people
Italian film actresses
Italian television actresses
Italian stage actresses
UNICEF Goodwill Ambassadors
Actresses from Rome
20th-century Italian actresses
21st-century Italian actresses